Aponomma is a genus of ticks belonging to the family Ixodidae.

The species of this genus are found in Australia and Central America.

Species:
 Aponomma orlovi
 Aponomma varanese (Supino, 1897)

References

Ixodidae
Taxa named by Fernando Lahille